Fly Gibraltar was a proposed foreign-owned low-cost airline to be based in Gibraltar, with destinations in the United Kingdom and Ireland. The airline stated that it would commence flying in April 2007.

A later announcement said its operation was on hold until June or perhaps spring 2008. A further announcement was made in June 2007 stating that Fly Gibraltar would not be executing any operations due to insurmountable financial issues.

History
Press releases about the proposed airline were issued in August 2006, describing it as wholly owned by OEM (International) Ltd, a construction company which later had their building contracts cancelled by the government of Gibraltar. Organizers initially claimed flights during the first year of operations would be conducted under the air operator certificate of Astraeus. After extended delays in starting operation, in June 2007 it was announced that operations would never begin. The reason given was an inability to deposit the £10m insurance bond with the Civil Aviation Authority required to commence business.

There is no evidence that the company ever actually contacted either Astraeus or the CAA. Within weeks of the high-profile presentation, airline industry sources in the UK were saying it was pie in the sky.

Representatives of the government of Gibraltar said the promised routes would be offered to other airlines.

Destinations
The airline purported would have flown between Gibraltar and Dublin, Cork, Birmingham, Bristol, Manchester and London Stansted Airport.

The airline website that was briefly online included claims that online bookings would be available as from March 2007, but the site is no longer functional.

References

Airlines of Gibraltar
Defunct European low-cost airlines